The 1950 Florida A&M Rattlers football team was an American football team that represented Florida A&M University as a member of the Southern Intercollegiate Athletic Conference (SIAC) during the 1950 college football season. In their sixth season under head coach Jake Gaither, the Rattlers compiled an 8–1–1 record. The team played its home games at Bragg Stadium in Tallahassee, Florida.

The team was recognized as the black college national co-champion. The team played a scoreless tie with Ace Mumford's national co-champion 1950 Southern Jaguars football team. In the final Dickinson rankings, three undefeated black colleges received the following point totals: Florida A&M (28.76); Southern (28.50); and Maryland State (28.00).

Schedule

References

Florida AandM
Florida A&M Rattlers football seasons
Black college football national champions
Florida AandM Rattlers football